Challhuacocha (possibly from Quechua challwa fish, qucha lake, "fish lake") is a lake in the Cusco Region in Peru. It is situated in the Calca Province, Pisac District.

References 

Lakes of Peru
Lakes of Cusco Region